Exoteleia dodecella, the pine bud moth, is a moth of the family Gelechiidae. It is widely distributed from western Europe to Siberia. It is an introduced species in North America.

The wingspan is 9–15 mm. The head is grey, face whitish.Terminal joint of palpi as long as second. Forewings are whitish, densely irrorated with dark fuscous, appearing grey ; indistinct broad darker fasciae at 1/3 and 2/3 a black basal dot, and a dash beneath costa at 1/4 ; two black dots transversely placed in disc at 1/4 ; stigmata black, first discal above plical, another black dot below second discal ; a fine indistinct whitish interrupted fascia at 3/4 : on undersurface a longitudinal patch of thinly set erect scales in disc. Hindwings 1, grey.The larva is brownish-flesh colour ; dots black ; head black-brown.

Adults are on wing from June to July.

The larvae feed on Larix europaeus, Pinus mugo and Pinus sylvestris. Young larvae mine the needles of their host plant. The larva enters the needle of its length, at the flat side; the opening is closed with silk. The larvae mine upwards from about three quarters of the needle. They live in a larval chamber in the lowest part of the mine. The frass is deposited in the apical part of the mine. After overwintering, they live in spun needles and feed on the shoots. Pupation takes place outside of the mine within a bud. Mining larvae can be found from September to March.

References
 

 

Exoteleia
Moths of Asia
Moths of Europe
Moths of Japan
Moths described in 1758
Taxa named by Carl Linnaeus